Chifu is a surname. Notable people with the surname include: 

Iulian Chifu (born 1968), Romanian foreign policy analyst and presidential adviser
Valter Chifu (born 1952), Romanian volleyball player